{{Infobox video game
| title     = Hercules: The Legendary Journeys
| image     = Hercules The Legendary Journeys Cover.jpg
| caption   = N64 Cover Art
| developer = Titus Interactive, Player 1 
| publisher = Titus Interactive
| released  = N64Game Boy Color| genre     = Action
| modes     = Single-player
| platforms = Nintendo 64, Game Boy Color
}}Hercules: The Legendary Journeys is a video game developed by Player 1 and published by Titus Interactive for the Nintendo 64 in 2000 and developed and published by Titus Interactive for the Game Boy Color in 2001. The game is licensed from the 1995 television series of the same name, and the Game Boy Color title was released by Titus Interactive alongside Xena: Warrior Princess in the same month, with both games having linked features using the Game Link Cable.

Gameplay 

 

The player controls Hercules and his friends, Iolaus and Serena, to free Zeus against the forces of Area and Hera and their minions. The Nintendo 64 version of Hercules integrates elements of platform, role-playing and adventure games. Players control characters to complete combat, quests and puzzles, with each having unique abilities, such as Hercules' ability to throw items, Iolaus' ability to reach otherwise inaccessible places, and Serena's ability to use ranged weaponry. Combat is straightforward and uses direct attacks against player and enemy "life energy", as well as a "magic menu" to cast magical powers as a special ability. The game features twelve locations and five arenas. The Game Boy Color version of Hercules differs slightly from the Nintendo 64 version. The game is played in mixed perspectives as an overhead and side-scrolling action-adventure game. The Game Boy version also contains the notable feature of being able to use the Game Link Cable with a system playing Xena: Warrior Princess to switch the characters in the game and unlock secret levels. 

Reception

Reception of the Nintendo 64 version of Hercules was mixed. 64 praised the range of content in the game, stating "there are plenty of puzzles to crack, codes to break and people to save...you are never bored for want of something to do", and the "many different environments" in the game. GameSpot assessed the game as a "moderately challenging" game and "decent adventure", praising the simple control scheme and "solid" presentation. 

Criticism directed towards Hercules was directed towards the derivative nature of the game, with several reviewers raising unfavorable comparisons to The Legend of Zelda: Ocarina of Time. Official Nintendo Magazine remarked the game was "not (ugly) but the levels are so big and empty" and "not exactly inspiring," labelling the game as a "Zelda wannabe" due to similarities in the control system and menu screens. Similarly, Nintendo Power found the game to be a "pale Zelda wannabe", stating "much of the quest is bogged down with repetitive combat and uneventful exploration". 

The Game Boy Color version of Hercules received mixed reviews, with critics finding frustration with the execution of the gameplay. In a lukewarm review, Jem Roberts of Total Game Boy praised the "genuinely compelling" puzzles and found "loads to do" in the game, but observed the game was compromised by "stupid challenges" and an "unbelievably irritating" save system. In contrast, Oliver Lan of Game Boy Xtreme dismissed the game as "monotonous" and "irritating", finding most of the gameplay involving "trudging around with nothing to do", although acknowledged the game contained an "interesting mix of gameplay styles." Both reviews remarked the game was superior to the Game Boy Color counterpart Xena: Warrior Princess''.

References

External links

2000 video games
2001 video games
Game Boy Color games
Nintendo 64 games
Single-player video games
Titus Software games